Yanina Sergeevna Studilina  (born 6 August 1985) is a Russian theater and film actress, fashion model, TV presenter.

Biography 
Yanina Studilina was born in Omsk, Russian SFSR, Soviet Union. In 2000, she graduated from the theater and music school. In 2011, she graduated from  Boris Shchukin Theatre Institute.
Gained popularity after the television series Ranetki. She worked at a leading TV channel RU.TV and Russian Travel Guide.

Married to Alexander Rodnyansky Jr., with whom she is in a relationship since 2008.

Selected filmography
 2006-2007 – Who’s the Boss? as Mila
 2006-2008 – Happy Together as Sveta's girlfriend
 2008 – One Night of Love as Polina
 2008-2010 – Ranetki as Polina Zelenova
 2009 – Voronin's (TV series) as Alina
 2012 – The White Guard (TV series) as Anyuta
 2013 – Stalingrad as Masha
 2014 – Unreal Love as Elena
 2014 – Turkish Transit (TV series) as Rita Zvonareva
 2015 – The Red Queen as Tata Smirnova
 2016 – Island as Olga Feigus, beautiful and clever girl, ready to do anything for the sake of winning the reality show "The Mysterious Island".

References

External links 
 
 Сайт об актрисе

1985 births
Living people
Actors from Omsk
Russian film actresses
Russian television actresses
Russian stage actresses
21st-century Russian actresses
Russian television presenters
Female models from Omsk
Russian women television presenters
Financial University under the Government of the Russian Federation alumni